The 5th Central Committee of the Lao People's Revolutionary Party (LPRP) was elected at the 5th LPRP National Congress in 1991. It was composed of 55 members and four alternates.

Members

Alternates

References

Specific

Bibliography
Articles:
 

5th Central Committee of the Lao People's Revolutionary Party
1991 establishments in Laos
1996 disestablishments in Laos